Steven James Deace (born July 28, 1973) is an American talk show host. His program The Steve Deace Show is on the Blaze Media platform.

Early life
Born on July 28, 1973, Deace is the son of Vickie McNeeley. McNeeley, who was 14 years old and not married at the time, brought the pregnancy to full term after deciding not to have an abortion. She went on to raise him and one other child as a single mother in the Grand Rapids, Michigan area. McNeely later married when Deace was three years old. Although he was not formally adopted, Deace bears his stepfather's surname. He attended Michigan State University in the early 1990s, but later dropped out of school.

Career
Deace's first job was as a sports reporter for The Des Moines Register. He then hosted a sports talk show on KXNO (AM), and later an evening drive talk show on WHO (AM). While at WHO, Deace endorsed and gave airtime to Republican presidential candidate Mike Huckabee during the 2008 Iowa Caucuses, which helped Huckabee win the state's  presidential primary. In 2010, he helped the successful campaign to defeat three members of the Iowa Supreme Court who approved same-sex marriage. 

Deace left WHO in early 2011 to launch a nationally-syndicated radio program, The Steve Deace Show, on the Truth Radio Network. Later that year, Salem Radio Network picked up his program and moved it to primetime.

Deace endorsed Ted Cruz for president in 2016 and worked as a senior campaign operative in Iowa for Cruz's presidential campaign. After Cruz dropped out of the race in May 2016, he posted a voter registration form with a check mark next to "no party" in response to calls for Republican unity behind Donald Trump and his presidential campaign. When Ted Cruz endorsed Trump in September 2016, Deace said it was "the worst political miscalculation of my lifetime.” He went on to vote for Constitution Party's candidate, Darrell Castle, in the general election.

In 2017, Deace's program moved to CRTV, a conservative streaming platform. Later that year, he defended Steve Bannon's role in the White House, arguing that it would be a mistake for Trump to fire Bannon because of the signal it would send to conservatives.  In 2018, his program moved to BlazeTV after CRTV merged with it.

During the 2020 election, Deace announced he was voting for Donald Trump. When it was apparent that Joe Biden was defeating Trump, Deace cast doubt about the validity of the vote in swing states, saying "When you went to bed Trump was ahead and the counting miraculously stopped. When you woke up it resumed, with Biden garnering Chavez-like totals in the dead of night. This is a coup."

Personal life
He and his wife, Amy, have three children. Deace is a Christian, converting in 2003 after attending a Promise Keepers rally.

References

External links

American talk radio hosts
1973 births
Living people
American podcasters
Blaze Media people
Conservatism in the United States